Swati may refer to:

Films 
 Swati (1984 film), a Telugu film
 Swati (1986 film), a 1986 Bollywood romantic drama film
 Swati Mutyam, a 1986 Telugu-language drama film written, directed by K. Viswanath
 Swati Kiranam, a 1992 Telugu musical drama film directed by K. Viswanath

Other uses 
 Swati language (disambiguation), several languages with the name
 Swazi people, an ethnic group of southern Africa
 a resident of Swat, Pakistan, or the former princely state of Swat
 Swati (Pashtun tribe)
 Shah Miri dynasty, a dynasty of Turco-Iranian origin which ruled Kashmir from 1339 to 1561
 Swati (star), a star in ancient Sanskrit scriptures

Persons with the name 
 Abdul Hameed Swati (1917–2008), Pakistani Islamic scholar
 Azam Khan Swati (born 1947), Pakistani politician and businessman
 Babar Saleem Swati, Pakistani politician
 Riffat Akbar Swati (born 1946), member of the provincial assembly
 Swati Dandekar (born 1951), state representative of Iowa
 Swati Kaushal, Indian writer
 Swati Mia Saini, American financial journalist and video host
 Swati Maliwal, Indian activist
 Swati Reddy, Indian TV host and actress
 Swati (field hockey) (born 1990), Indian field hockey player

See also 
 Swathi (disambiguation)
 Svati
 Swat (disambiguation)
 Operations against the Mohmands, Bunerwals and Swatis in 1915